Zachary J. Cook is an American politician and a Republican member of the New Mexico House of Representatives representing District 56 since his January 16, 2009 appointment by Governor of New Mexico Bill Richardson to fill the vacancy caused by the resignation of W. C. Williams.

Education
Cook graduated from University of New Mexico School of Law.

Elections
2012 Cook was unopposed for both the June 5, 2012 Republican Primary, winning with 1,882 votes and the November 6, 2012 General election, winning with 7,721 votes.
2010 Cook was unopposed for both the June 1, 2010 Republican Primary, winning with 2,007 votes and the November 2, 2010 General election, winning with 5,620 votes.

Notable legislation
In 2015, Cook introduced H.B 560, a bill to end civil asset forfeiture, replacing it with criminal asset forfeiture. The bill was signed into law on April 10, 2015.

References

External links
Official page at the New Mexico Legislature

Zachary Cook at Ballotpedia
Zach J. Cook at the National Institute on Money in State Politics

Place of birth missing (living people)
Year of birth missing (living people)
Living people
Republican Party members of the New Mexico House of Representatives
New Mexico lawyers
People from Ruidoso, New Mexico
University of New Mexico School of Law alumni
21st-century American politicians